Jo Sung-jin (born 14 December 1990) is a South Korean football defender.

Career 
After graduating from Yuseong Bio Science Technology High School, he joined Roasso Kumamoto on 25 March 2009. He scored his first goal with Shonan Bellmare on 3 June 2009.

References

External links

1990 births
Living people
Association football defenders
South Korean footballers
South Korean expatriate footballers
Roasso Kumamoto players
Kamatamare Sanuki players
Hokkaido Consadole Sapporo players
Suwon Samsung Bluewings players
J2 League players
Japan Football League players
K League 1 players
Expatriate footballers in Japan
South Korean expatriate sportspeople in Japan
Sportspeople from Daejeon